The NFL Top 100 Players of 2016 was the sixth season in the series. It aired on May 4, 2016. It ended with reigning NFL MVP Cam Newton being ranked #1. The Kansas City Chiefs had the most players selected with nine, while the Chicago Bears were the only team with no selections.

Episode list

The list

References

National Football League trophies and awards
National Football League records and achievements
National Football League lists